Drake is an unincorporated community in Larimer County, Colorado located in the Big Thompson Canyon between Estes Park, Colorado and Loveland, Colorado near Rocky Mountain National Park. The 2010 population of Drake was 1,010.

Geography
Its location is  (40.431269°, -105.339661°), on U.S. Highway 34 along the Big Thompson River.

See also
 List of cities and towns in Colorado
 Larimer County, Colorado

References

Unincorporated communities in Larimer County, Colorado
Unincorporated communities in Colorado